Khavaran may refer to:

 Khavaran, Fars, a city in Fars province, Iran
 Khavaran, Tehran, a neighborhood in Tehran, Iran
Khavavran cemetery, a cemetery that is located in the neighborhood.
 Khavaran, Tabriz, a town in Tabriz, Iran
 Khavaran District, Ray County, Tehran province
 Khavaran-e Gharbi Rural District, Ray County, Tehran province
 Khavaran-e Sharqi Rural District, Ray County, Tehran province
 Mothers of Khavaran